Wang Yan (born 22 August 1991) is a Chinese association football player who plays for Beijing BG Phoenix.

Career statistics

International

References

1991 births
Living people
Chinese women's footballers
China women's international footballers
Women's association football midfielders
Beijing BG Phoenix F.C. players
2019 FIFA Women's World Cup players
Footballers at the 2018 Asian Games
Asian Games silver medalists for China
Asian Games medalists in football
Medalists at the 2018 Asian Games
Footballers at the 2020 Summer Olympics
Olympic footballers of China